Habib Mohamed or Mohammed may refer to: 
 Habib Mohamed (footballer, born 1983)
 Habib Mohammed (footballer, born 1997)